Reino Iisakki Kuuskoski (18 January 1907 – 27 January 1965) was a Finnish jurist, born in Loimaa.

Kuuskoski was a member of the Agrarian League. He performed ministerial duties in Finland on two occasions. His first ministerial appointment was between 17 November 1953 and 5 May 1954 as Minister of Justice as part of Finland's 37th Government. His second ministerial appointment was between 26 April and 29 August 1958 as Prime Minister of Finland's 43rd Government. Both governments were caretaker governments.

During his career Kuuskoski also performed the duties of the President of the Supreme Administrative Court of Finland. Kuuskoski was also Finland's seventh Parliamentary Ombudsman and one of the principal persons renewing Finnish municipal legislation.

Cabinets
 Kuuskoski Cabinet

References

1907 births
1965 deaths
People from Loimaa
People from Turku and Pori Province (Grand Duchy of Finland)
Centre Party (Finland) politicians
Prime Ministers of Finland
Ministers of Justice of Finland
Ombudsmen
University of Helsinki alumni